The barye (symbol: Ba), or sometimes barad, barrie, bary, baryd, baryed, or barie, is the centimetre–gram–second (CGS) unit of pressure. It is equal to 1 dyne per square centimetre.

 =  =  =  =  =

See also
Pascal (unit)
International System of Units

References

Centimetre–gram–second system of units
Units of pressure